Starokudashevo (İśke Qoźaş) is a rural locality (a selo) and the administrative centre of Starokudashevsky Selsoviet, Yanaulsky District, Bashkortostan, Russia. The population was 395 as of 2010. There are 7 streets.

Geography 
Starokudashevo is located 30 km southwest of Yanaul (the district's administrative centre) by road. Stary Oryebash is the nearest rural locality.

References 

Rural localities in Yanaulsky District